is a former Japanese football player and manager. He played for Japan national team. His brother Masaru Uchiyama also played for Japan national team.

Club career
Uchiyama was born in Shizuoka on June 29, 1959. After graduating from Kokushikan University, he joined Japan Soccer League Division 2 club Yamaha Motors in 1982. In 1982, the club won the champions and was promoted to Division 1. The club also won Emperor's Cup. The club won the league champions in 1987–88. He retired in 1992. He played 195 games and scored 18 goals in the league.

National team career
On September 30, 1984, Uchiyama debuted for Japan national team against South Korea. In 1995, he also played at 1986 World Cup qualification. He played 2 games for Japan until 1986.

Coaching career
After retirement, Uchiyama started coaching career at Yamaha Motors (later Júbilo Iwata) in 1992. He mainly served as a coach for top team and a manager for youth team. In September 2007, he became a manager for top team as Adílson Batista successor. However he was sacked in August 2008. In 2015, he became a manager for Japan U-20 national team. At 2016 AFC U-19 Championship, U-20 Japan won the champions first time and won to qualify for 2017 U-20 World Cup for the first time in 10 years. He resigned after 2017 U-20 World Cup.

Club statistics

National team statistics

Managerial statistics

References

External links

Japan National Football Team Database

1959 births
Living people
Kokushikan University alumni
Association football people from Shizuoka Prefecture
Japanese footballers
Japan international footballers
Japan Soccer League players
Júbilo Iwata players
Japanese football managers
J1 League managers
Júbilo Iwata managers
Association football midfielders